Orlando Gabriel Gaona Lugo (born 25 July 1990) is a Paraguayan footballer currently playing for Club Nacional.

Career
Gaona signed with Argentine Primera División side Boca Juniors as a youth, but has only made a few appearances with the first team. Paraguayan side Club Olimpia has discussed a transfer but Boca Juniors is unwilling to release him from his contract.

Honours
Boca Juniors
Primera División: 2
 2011 Apertura
 2011–12 Copa Argentina

References

External links
 
 

1990 births
Living people
People from Villa Hayes
Paraguayan footballers
Paraguayan expatriate footballers
Argentine Primera División players
Paraguayan Primera División players
Boca Juniors footballers
Olimpo footballers
Club Olimpia footballers
Club Guaraní players
Sportivo Luqueño players
Club Nacional footballers
Association football wingers
Paraguayan expatriate sportspeople in Argentina
Expatriate footballers in Argentina